Hendrik Jan Schoo (born November 10, 1945 - died September 9, 2007) also known as HJ Schoo was a Dutch author, journalist, essayist and magazine editor. He served as the editor-in-chief of Elsevier magazine and was the deputy editor of de Volkskrant newspaper for which he wrote columns.

Biography
Schoo was born in Amsterdam. His father was a sales representative and his mother a nurse. He was a brother of politician and government minister Eegje Schoo. He initially trained as a teacher before going to study social sciences at the University of Chicago. He later worked at an African-American primary school before returning to the Netherlands.

Career
Schoo began his career as an editor and writer for Montessori Communications, a publication of the Dutch Montessori Association. He then worked for a psychology publication before joining Elsevier in 1991 as a columnist, rising up to become deputy editor and then chief editor from 1993 to 1999. Politically, Schoo took on a conservative slant and was critical of multiculturalism in his opinion columns. One of Schoo's most notable acts as editor was appointing sociology professor Pim Fortuyn as a columnist in 1993. Both Schoo and Fortuyn would influence each other's beliefs, and the column helped Fortuyn to gain more public exposure in the Netherlands before he embarked on a political career. At the end of 1999, Schoo resigned from Elsevier to become deputy editor-in-chief of de Volkskrant.

Personal life
Schoo was married twice, first to Dutch writer Xandra Schutte by whom he had a son. He died following complications after heart surgery in 2007.

References

1945 births
2007 deaths
Dutch male writers
Dutch journalists
Dutch non-fiction writers
Dutch educators
Dutch expatriates in the United States
Dutch essayists 
Conservatism in the Netherlands
Critics of multiculturalism
University of Chicago alumni